Selo pri Mirni is a small village northwest of Mirna in the Municipality of Mirna in southeastern Slovenia. The area is part of the traditional region of Lower Carniola. The municipality is now included in the Southeast Slovenia Statistical Region.

Name
The name of the settlement was changed from Selo to Selo pri Mirni in 1955.

Church
The local church, built in the hamlet of Žunovec north of the settlement, is dedicated to Saint Peter and belongs to the Parish of Mirna. It is originally a Gothic building from at least the 16th century. The sanctuary dates to the 17th century and the belfry to the 19th century.

References

External links

Selo pri Mirni on Geopedia

Populated places in the Municipality of Mirna